Leaves Me Blind is the second album by Australian indie rock/electronic band Underground Lovers, released in the UK in August 1992 and Australia in December. It was the first album released as part of a recording contract with the Polydor label. Three singles, "Ladies Choice" (August 1992) "I Was Right" (November 1992) and a remix of "Your Eyes" (August 1993) were taken from the album.

The band included surging, 15-minute versions of "Your Eyes" as part of their 35-minute sets supporting The Cure on their eight-date Australian tour in August 1992.

A version of "Whisper Me Nothing" by Underground Lovers featuring Stephen Cummings on vocals appeared on Cummings' 1994 CD single "September 13" .

In 2010, music writers and critics John O'Donnell, Toby Creswell and Craig Mathieson named Leaves Me Blind as the 54th greatest Australian album in their book 100 Best Australian Albums.

Track listing
(All music by Glenn Bennie and Vincent Giarrusso, all lyrics by Vincent Giarrusso, except where noted)
"Eastside Stories" (Maurice Argiro, Glenn Bennie, Vincent Giarrusso) – 7:09
"Promenade" – 4:31
"I Was Right" (Maurice Argiro, Glenn Bennie, Vincent Giarrusso) – 4:18
"Holiday" – 3:43
"Got Off On It" (Maurice Argiro, Glenn Bennie, Vincent Giarrusso, Richard Andrew, Philippa Nihill) – 4:01
"Daze"  – 2:14
"Waves" – 2:55
"Your Eyes"  – 8:29
"Ladies Choice" – 9:16
"Get To Know" – 2:09
"Whisper Me Nothing" – 2:17

Personnel

Glenn Bennie – guitars, drums 
Vincent Giarrusso – vocals
Maurice Argiro — bass
Philippa Nihill — vocals
Richard Andrew — drums

Technical personnel
Wayne Connolly — recording engineer

References

1992 albums
Underground Lovers albums
Polydor Records albums